Scott Milne Matheson (1897–1958) was the United States Attorney for the District of Utah from 1949 to 1953.

Matheson was born in Parowan, Utah, and served in the United States army during World War I. Matheson received his bachelor's degree from the University of Utah and then taught high school for a time in Parowan. He then went to Chicago where he earned a J.D. degree from the University of Chicago and did further studies at Northwestern University. In 1930, Matheson returned to Iron County, Utah, where he formed the law firm Matheson and Morris and also taught at the institution that is now Southern Utah University. From 1932 to 1934, he was the county attorney for Iron County. He was also a counselor in the presidency of the local stake of the Church of Jesus Christ of Latter-day Saints. In 1934, Matheson was made an assistant United States Attorney for the District of Utah. In 1949, he was appointed United States Attorney for the District of Utah by President Harry S. Truman. In 1953, he resigned this office largely due to ill health.

Matheson is the father of Scott M. Matheson Jr., who served as Governor of Utah from 1977 to 1985. Matheson Sr. is the grandfather of U.S. Congressman Jim Matheson and federal judge Scott Matheson Jr.

Sources
Biography of Matheson from the United States attorney's office

1897 births
Latter Day Saints from Utah
United States Army personnel of World War I
Northwestern University alumni
Southern Utah University faculty
United States Attorneys for the District of Utah
University of Chicago alumni
University of Utah alumni
1958 deaths
People from Parowan, Utah